Adzyubzha is a rural settlement in the Ochamchira District of Abkhazia, Georgia’s breakaway republic.

Situated at the mouth of Kodori River, the settlement was known as the most important centre of the Afro-Abkhazian population who lived in Adzyubzha and its vicinity.

History 
Adzyubzha had a population of 3597 people in 1989 but it was significantly depopulated following the 1993 War. The Georgian population (mostly Mingrelians and Lechkhumeli) moved to Georgia, while non-Georgians emigrated to other parts of Abkhazia as well as Russia. At the time of the  2011 Abkhazian Census, Adzyubzha had a population of 1,072. Of these, 84.0% were Abkhaz, 6.0% Russian, 5.8% Georgian, 1.0% Armenian, 0.7% Greek and 0.1% Ukrainian.

See also
 Ochamchira District
 Abkhazians of African descent

References

Populated places in Ochamchira District
Sukhum Okrug